Tweedy is an English and Scottish surname. Notable people with the surname include:

Alfred Tweedy (born 1880), American politician 
Alice B. Tweedy (1850-1934), American journalist and writer
Cheryl Tweedy (born 1983), English singer, dancer, and television personality
Damon Tweedy, American physician and academic
Frank Tweedy (1854-1937), American botanist
George Tweedy (1913–1987), English footballer
Hilda Tweedy (1911–2005), Irish activist
Jeff Tweedy (born 1967), American songwriter, musician, and record producer
John Tweedy (1849–1924), British surgeon
John Hubbard Tweedy (1814–1891), American politician
Samuel Tweedy (1776–1868), American politician